is an erotic original video animation (OVA) based on the manga Nami SOS! created by Chataro in 1995. The animation was given a different name in North America for several reasons. The manga on which it is based was largely unknown in the Western world. The title "Sexy Sailor Soldiers" was chosen for its similarity to the popular anime, Sailor Moon, which had achieved commercial success in the West. The author took inspiration from that show for many features of his manga books.

Currently, the adaptation consists of a single episode, which contains the majority of the first manga's plot, with some slight changes in the scenes. It was developed by A.P.P.P., Moonrock Studios and released on October 25, 2003, in Japan, and on July 27, 2006, in North America, licensed by Critical Mass. The main features of the show are its supernatural elements, the characters' very large breasts, armed combat, and sexual acts both with and without tentacles.

Synopsis
Nami Koishikawa's curvaceous figure gets her a lot of (sometimes unwanted) attention. At the end of her first day working at a restaurant, she rushes to the aid of an injured woman behind her workplace. The woman hands her a strange-looking pendant and begs her to "take her place". Nami wonders why she was given the pendant and what its purpose is. Moments later, during an awkward situation on her way home, Nami accidentally presses the pendant and, to the surprise of everyone, transforms into a Sexy Sailor Soldier in a skimpy uniform.

The mission of a "soldier" is to hunt and eliminate demons, of whom normal people (such as Nami's brother Katsuo), are unaware. Nami notices that, once she transforms, she gains magical powers, but she is initially too scared to use them for anything but running away. The pendant Nami received raises pheromone levels in transformed soldiers, driving all demons crazy with sexual desire and alerting the holder to be ready to protect herself.

Unfortunately, Nami doesn't know this, which makes her first demon hunt difficult. She is chased by a demon with no way to escape until they arrive at a skyscraper. Chisato Yamane, Nami's best friend, is already a veteran soldier and knows what to do. Chisato tries to rescue Nami by fighting the demon. However, despite her efforts, both of them are captured in a portal with dozens of demons. Nami manages to free them from the portal and other soldiers help them by fighting off the pursuing demons.

Main characters featured in the OVA
The original video animation (OVA) features four primary characters.

Nami Koishikawa 

 is the blonde-haired protagonist and the last to become part of the soldier girls team. She is an innocent girl who does not know why all men are attracted to her. Nami enjoys wearing skimpy work uniforms, though she can never find one that does not put her breasts in danger of popping out. Inadvertently, she will instantly change her clothes into a soldier's uniform by pressing the "Lust Eye". When she gets defensive in the battlefield, she uses a wooden stick, which can be turned into a sharp sword through the magic in her pendant eye. It can also unleash a blinding light that is one of the demon's greatest weaknesses. One of her biggest problems is finding out how to use the power she possesses to protect everyone and everything from demons.

Chisato Yamane 

 has the appearance of a normal waitress, but she is always concerned about demons hidden among normal people. She is already in the group of soldiers before Nami, so Chisato helps and protects her friend from demons, as long as she is not captured first.  Nami's brother, Katsuo, is the one who Chisato secretly loves (the third manga contains a special section detailing the relationship between them), but she has no time to speak when they find themselves in a critical situation. Disregarding her secret identity, she transforms in front of Katsuo. He is probably the only one who knows her true identity. Transformed into a sailor, she wears a pink uniform. Her soldier weapon is a baton which discharges electric charges. However, it takes time to generate the electricity, making it easy to block or to use the baton against her.

Katsuo 

 is responsible for his sister Nami, so he would try to protect her at all costs. He has the wrong idea of what the sailor soldier suit is for, so he does not let his sister join the group. He is a lonely man and, when his sister is out, he takes the opportunity to watch sex movies. He has no special or magical powers, but he has strength that is effective only with normal people, not with demons. He still finds other ways to protect his sister.

Mr. Sasao 

 is the captain of the sexual demons. He uses his disguise as a bespectacled, brunet restaurant boss to keep an eye on his victims. An odd skill for him is sewing extremely skimpy uniforms for one special waitress he has just employed. Nobody realizes his demonic nature until he comes into contact with Nami and he's forced to metamorphose into a winged demon with long purple tentacles. During a long chase of a soldier, he arrives at the highest building of the city where, thanks to one of Sasao's darkness portals, his secret demon clan appears inside. They await news about captured soldiers. When Sasao opens a gate to their portal, they are sure Mr. Sasao will approve anything as captain of sexual demons. They anticipate enjoying time with the captives provided by Mr. Sasao. Once Nami Koishikawa recovers her control of her body from Sasao, she and her friend are freed from their captivity. However, Sasao fights against them, and he and Nami are forced to fight to the death. The demon clan is an easy target for the soldiers. However, Sasao is a difficult demon to destroy, especially because he has the ability to cause instant death with his tentacles, and his body can instantly recover from deadly wounds inflicted by a sword.

Production
There are differences between the two regional launches, such as the animation format. Japan produced VHS and DVD. However, VHS was not a commercially viable format when it was launched in America, so it was unavailable there. The Japanese cover displays artwork of Nami being cornered by Sasao within some buildings at night. The American version shows the five soldiers from a photo animation edited to fill the space of the cover.

Re-release
In order to maintain availability in stores, on October 2, 2012, Critical Mass made a second release, distinguished from the first one by its slight improvements on the front cover. The older version does not have the Critical Mass banner on it, only an age warning.

Cast

OVA features
 Format: DVD NTCS, and VHS NTCS (in Japan only)
 Aspect ratio: 4:3 (1.33:1)
 Sound: stereo, Dolby Digital
 Language: English and Japanese
 Subtitles: English, soft and normal
 Special: art gallery, outtakes, scene access, original S.S.S. U.S. trailer and Critical Mass trailers

Manga

The most famous and successful of Chataro's manga is Nami SOS, inspired by the Sailor Moon anime. Chataro wanted to push the limits of what an anime series can show to the public, taking chances with the hentai genre. He began his production in late 1994. It began as a simple indirect comedy dōjinshi, and was later converted into an independent manga series, taking many characteristics from other anime, such as the sailor uniforms, hairstyles, and magical transformations, converting them into provocative characters and mixing in skimpy soldier suits and sexual demons with tentacles. The formula was defined and the story began in mid-1995 when the first manga volume was launched.

Initially, it was only sold in Japan, because there was no official dealer in North America which could translate the manga's text. There are a total of six volumes released, with then more to come. The manga tells an extended story and remains dedicated to the OVA characters, such as the relationship beside Chisato and Katsuo, the origins of Keiko's powers, and Keiko's brother.

In newer presentations, there are new characters, such as a family of hunter women, previously unprecedented in the animation.

List of manga volumes

Sigma Comics addition
In late 2006 after finishing the Nami SOS! Naoko Black Bird manga which was the last contract with the editorial Fujimi Shuppan, Chataro published his famous manga in Sigma Comics under a sequence of small chapters from 8 to 12 pages, each one with other erotic manga from the same magazine partner. the first work with Sigma was Nami SOS! 5 Girls before Keiko and it was published monthly in Japan in said magazine during the period of December 2006 to July 2008 totaling 21 chapters. This manga was never independent and it can be found on sale online or in older Sigma comics. After Story of 5 Girls before Keiko Chataro prepared its next step with the series publishing the next manga named Imma Hunters, first published in the same monthly magazine from February 2007 to December 2011 and days later it was published in an independent manga book with the association of Tenma comics editorial with all the chapters on it, this manga is the latest and longest Chataro work until now with a total of 64 chapters.

Comic Penguin Club Sanzokuban
From April 2014 Chataro started a work with the Japanese publisher and monthly magazine Penguin Club Sanzokuban (COMICペンギンクラブ山賊版) and to date is the newest from him. This new work is called Nami return! (奈美リターン！) and consists of a comeback of the main character Nami Koishikawa, who now occupies most of the scenes where the story unfolds and there are also new characters.

References

External links  
 

1995 manga
2003 anime OVAs
Hentai anime and manga
Magical girl anime and manga